Pauridiantha chlorantha is a species of plant in the family Rubiaceae. It is endemic to Tanzania. Under the synonym Rhipidantha chlorantha, it was the only species in the monotypic genus Rhipidantha.

References 

Urophylleae
Flora of Tanzania
Taxonomy articles created by Polbot